Pattern theory, formulated by Ulf Grenander, is a mathematical formalism to describe knowledge of the world as patterns. It differs from other approaches to artificial intelligence in that it does not begin by prescribing algorithms and machinery to recognize and classify patterns; rather, it prescribes a vocabulary to articulate and recast the pattern concepts in precise language. Broad in its mathematical coverage, Pattern Theory spans algebra and statistics, as well as local topological and global entropic properties.

In addition to the new algebraic vocabulary, its statistical approach is novel in its aim to:
 Identify the hidden variables of a data set using real world data rather than artificial stimuli, which was previously commonplace.
 Formulate prior distributions for hidden variables and models for the observed variables that form the vertices of a Gibbs-like graph.
 Study the randomness and variability of these graphs.
 Create the basic classes of stochastic models applied by listing the deformations of the patterns.
 Synthesize (sample) from the models, not just analyze signals with them.

The Brown University Pattern Theory Group was formed in 1972 by Ulf Grenander. Many mathematicians are currently working in this group, noteworthy among them being the Fields Medalist David Mumford.  Mumford regards Grenander as his "guru" in Pattern Theory.

See also
 Abductive reasoning
 Algebraic statistics
 Computational anatomy
 Formal concept analysis
 Grammar induction
 Image analysis
 Induction
 Lattice theory
 Spatial statistics

References

Further reading
 2007. Ulf Grenander and Michael Miller Pattern Theory: From Representation to Inference. Oxford University Press. Paperback.
 1994. Ulf Grenander General Pattern Theory. Oxford Science Publications.
 1996. Ulf Grenander Elements of Pattern Theory.  Johns Hopkins University Press.

External links
 Pattern Theory Group at Brown University
Pattern Theory: Grenander's Ideas and Examples - a video lecture by David Mumford
 Pattern Theory and Applications - graduate course page with material by a Brown University alumnus

Formalism (philosophy)
Artificial intelligence